Moel Lefn is a summit in Snowdonia. It is a subsidiary peak of Moel Hebog and a sister peak of Moel yr Ogof. Its summit marks the end of the Hebog ridge.

The North Eastern flank of Moel Lefn shows a good example of Columnar jointing within the rhyolite unit that comprises the majority of the mountain.

The Beddgelert Forest lies directly to the east, while Cwm Pennant lies to the west. Good views of the Nantlle ridge are observed. There are two tall upright stone cairns on the eastern side of the mountain.

References

External links 
 www.geograph.co.uk : photos of Moel Lefn and surrounding area

Beddgelert
Dolbenmaen
Mountains and hills of Gwynedd
Mountains and hills of Snowdonia
Hewitts of Wales
Nuttalls